Lacerta citrovittata, the Tinos green lizard, is a species of lizard in the family Lacertidae. It is endemic to  Greece.

References

 
Endemic fauna of Greece
Reptiles described in 1938